Saipriya Deva is an Indian actress who predominantly appears in Tamil cinema.

Career
Deva's family has been in the film business for almost a century. Her great-grandfather started, and grandfather (V.M. Paramasiva Mudalier) was the owner of Sri Murugan Talkies in Mint. She made her acting debut in the 2017 Tamil film Shivalinga directed by P. Vasu. She also acted in Malayalam film Ente Ummante Peru (2018).

Filmography

References 

Actresses in Tamil cinema
Indian film actresses
1994 births
Living people
Actresses from Chennai
Female models from Chennai
Actresses in Malayalam cinema